Aud Gaundal (born 10 November 1949 in Inderøy) is a Norwegian politician for the Labour Party.

She was elected to the Norwegian Parliament from Nord-Trøndelag in 1993, and was re-elected on two occasions. She had previously served in the position of deputy representative during the terms 1981–1985, 1985–1989 and 1989–1993.

Gaundal was a member of the executive committee of Steinkjer municipality council from 1979 to 1993. After the 2007 election she became Deputy Mayor of Steinkjer.

References

1949 births
Living people
Labour Party (Norway) politicians
Members of the Storting
Politicians from Nord-Trøndelag
Women members of the Storting
21st-century Norwegian politicians
21st-century Norwegian women politicians
20th-century Norwegian politicians
20th-century Norwegian women politicians
People from Inderøy